Dessau is a town in Germany, part of Dessau-Roßlau

Dessau may also refer to:

Places
 Dessau-Roßlau, a town in Germany
 Dessau (Arendsee),  a neighbourhood of Arendsee in Germany
 Dessau (Bavaria), a hamlet near Burggen in Germany
 Neu Dessau, a neighbourhood in Milower Land in Germany
 Dessau (region), Germany

As a surname
 Bruce Dessau, British comedy critic and writer
 Hermann Dessau (1856–1931), German historian and epigrapher
 Linda Dessau (born 1953), Australian judge and Governor of Victoria
 Ory Dessau, Israeli art curator and critic
 Paul Dessau (1894–1979), German composer and conductor
 Paul Lucien Dessau (1909–1999), British war artist

The family of Anhalt-Dessau
 George III, Prince of Anhalt-Dessau
 Leopold Anhalt-Dessau (disambiguation)
 Leopold I, Prince of Anhalt-Dessau
 Leopold II of Anhalt-Dessau
 Moritz of Anhalt-Dessau

Other uses
 SV Dessau 05
 Battle of Dessau Bridge
 Dessauer Ufer, a subcamp to the Neuengamme concentration camp
 Dessau Institute of Architecture
 Dessau (engineering), Canadian engineering firm

See also
 Dessauer
 Dessoir